Scandium dodecaboride is a refractory metal boride.

Synthesis 

ScB12 is formed by mixing a 7:1 ratio of boron powder and scandium oxide powder, heating to 2500 °C with a plasma torch or similar, quenching in cold water and washing with concentrated hydrochloric acid.

Crystallography 

ScB12 was originally reported as having a cubic structure, later studies showed it to have tetragonal structure (unit cell with a=522pm, c=735pm).  More recently it has been shown that there is indeed a cubic form but that it requires stabilization.

References

Scandium compounds
Borides